The 54th annual Venice International Film Festival was held between 27 August to 6 September 1997.

Jury 
The following people comprised the 1997 jury:
 Jane Campion (New Zealand) (head of jury)
 Ronald Bass (USA)
 Véra Belmont (France)
 Peter Buchka (Germany) (critic)
 Nana Dzhordzhadze (Georgia)
 Idrissa Ouedraogo (Burkina Faso)
 Charlotte Rampling (UK)
 Shinya Tsukamoto (Japan)
 Francesco Rosi (Italy)
 Marco Bellocchio (Italy) (short films) (head of jury)
 Clare Peploe (UK) (short films)
 Olivier Assayas (France) (short films)

Official selection

In competition

Autonomous sections

Venice International Film Critics' Week
The following feature films were selected to be screened as In Competition for this section:
 The Fifth Season (Fasl-e panjom) by Rafi Pitts (Iran)
 Gummo by Harmony Korine (United States)
 Marie from the Bay of Angels (Marie Baie des Anges) by Manuel Pradal (France)
 Masumiyet (en. Innocence) by Zeki Demirkubuz (Turkey)
 Dance of the Wind (Swara Mandal) by Rajan Khosa (India)
 To Die for Tano (Tano da morire) by Roberta Torre (Italy)
 Unmade Beds by Nicholas Barker (United Kingdom)

Awards 
Golden Lion:
Hana-bi (Takeshi Kitano)
Grand Special Jury Prize:
Ovosodo (Paolo Virzi)
Golden Osella:
Best Original Screenplay: Nettoyage à sec (Gilles Taurand)
Best Cinematography: Ossos (Emmanuel Machuel)
Best Original Music: Chinese Box (Graeme Revell)
Volpi Cup:
Best Actor: Wesley Snipes (One Night Stand)
Best Actress: Robin Tunney (Niagara, Niagara)
The President of the Italian Senate's Gold Medal:
The Thief (Pavel Chukhraj)
Luigi de Laurentiis Award:
Tano da morire (Roberta Torre)
Career Golden Lion:
Gérard Depardieu
Stanley Kubrick
Alida Valli
Prize of the International Youth Jury:
The Thief (Pavel Chukhraj)
FIPRESCI Prize:
Love Stories (Jerzy Stuhr)
Twenty Four Seven (Shane Meadows)
FIPRESCI Prize - Honorable Mention:
Harmony Korine (Gummo)
OCIC Award:
The Winter Guest (Alan Rickman)
OCIC Award - Honorable Mention:
Jerzy Stuhr (Love Stories)
Nouri Bouzid (Bent Familia)
UNICEF Award:
The Thief (Pavel Chukhraj)
UNESCO Award:
La strana storia di Banda Sonora (Francesca Archibugi)
Pasinetti Award:
Best Film: Giro di lune tra terra e mare
Best Actor: Edoardo Gabbriellini (Ovosodo)
Best Actress: Emma Thompson (The Winter Guest)
Pietro Bianco Award:
Bernardo Bertolucci
Isvema Award:
Giro di lune tra terra e mare (Giuseppe M. Gaudino)
FEDIC Award:
Tano da morire (Roberta Torre)
FEDIC Award - Honorable Mention:
Amleto... frammenti (Bruno Bigoni)
Little Golden Lion:
Ovosodo (Paolo Virzi)
Anicaflash Prize:
Love Stories (Jerzy Stuhr)
Elvira Notari Prize:
Bent Familia (Nouri Bouzid)
Bastone Bianco Award:
Alors voilà (Michel Piccoli)
Sergio Trasatti Award:
Love Stories (Jerzy Stuhr)
In memoriam Gyöngyössy Imre (Barna Kabay)
CinemAvvenire Award:
The Winter Guest (Alan Rickman)
Enzo Serafin Award:
Ovosodo (Italo Petriccione)
Kodak Award:
Tano da morire (Roberta Torre)

References

External links

Venice Film Festival 1997 Awards on IMDb

Venice
Venice
Venice Film Festival
Film
Venice
August 1997 events in Europe
September 1997 events in Europe